Blueberry Mountain is an unincorporated community in northwestern Alberta in Saddle Hills County, located on Highway 725,  north of Grande Prairie.

It was first settled in 1919 by homesteaders from Saskatchewan and veterans returning from the war.

References

External links 
Saddle Hills County official website

Localities in Saddle Hills County